Haido Alexouli (born 29 March 1991 in Larissa) is a Greek athlete who specialises in the long jump. She competed at the 2016 Summer Olympics.
Her father Giannis Alexoulis is a former professional football player who played for AEL FC and PAOK FC.

Competition record

References

External links 
 

1991 births
Living people
Greek female long jumpers
Athletes (track and field) at the 2016 Summer Olympics
Olympic athletes of Greece
Athletes (track and field) at the 2018 Mediterranean Games
Mediterranean Games competitors for Greece
Athletes from Larissa